Maydaa is a village in southern Syria, administratively part of the Douma District of the Rif Dimashq Governorate, located east of Damascus. Nearby localities include Adra to the north, al-Jarba to the south and Hawsh Nasri to the west. According to the Syria Central Bureau of Statistics (CBS), Maydaa had a population of 3,108 in the 2004 census.

References

Populated places in Douma District
Villages in Syria